Greater Dallas Korean American Chamber of Commerce (GDKACC) is a chamber of commerce that represents Korean-American businesses and institutions in Koreatown, Dallas, Texas and in the Dallas-Fort Worth Metroplex.

The Greater Dallas Korean American Chamber of Commerce was founded in 1976 as a resource for the Korean-American business community in Dallas, Texas. Dallas has the largest Korean American community in Texas and second (to Atlanta) in the Southern US. Most of the chamber's members and businesses are located in the sizeable Koreatown found in Northwest Dallas (United States), also known as the Asian Trade District. Many Koreans refer to the area as the "Korean Trade District", since the majority of businesses in the area are Korean. This area in the northwest part of the city is characterized by a large number of Korean-owned businesses serving the city's sizeable Korean American community.

The chamber is led by a board of notable Korean-American business professionals that includes CEO of  CVE Technology Group, Howard Cho. Michael Lee,  2011 President-Elect of the Greater Dallas Asian American Chamber of Commerce, has served as president of the Greater Dallas Korean American Chamber of Commerce since January, 2009.

Today the chamber is supported by roughly 1,000 businesses and organizations across twelve counties, and its members represent nearly 50,000 area employees. The chamber's mission statement is stated as:

“	As the most prominent representative of Korean American business entities in Greater Dallas, GDKACC fulfills a multi-faceted mission. In addition to supporting locally-based Korean American executives to provide the members with practical information and to promote friendly relations among the members, GDKACC is active in the development of "corporate diplomacy" initiatives to build economic cooperation and to advance closer relations between the Korean American community and other business communities in Greater Dallas.	"

The chamber works together with other Korean- American organizations operating in Koreatown, Dallas, Texas. These organizations include the  Korean American Coalition - Dallas/Fort Worth Metroplex Area Chapter (KAC-DFW), the *  Korean Society of Dallas, the  Korean Trade Promotion Corporation (KOTRA), the Korean Senior Citizens Association of Dallas, the Korean Women's Association, the Asian District Development Association of Dallas and numerous others. GDKACC also has on-going partnerships and programs with non-Korean and other chamber organizations including the City of Dallas, the Dallas Police Department (Texas), the Dallas Regional Chamber and the  Greater Dallas Asian American Chamber of Commerce. In May 2010, the chamber also signed a strategic memorandum of understanding with the  Korean Chamber of Commerce & Industry (KCCI) in Seoul, Korea.

Recent notable speakers before the Greater Dallas Korean American Chamber of Commerce include Korean Chamber of Commerce and Industry Vice President Don-geun Lee, Korean Consul General Yun-soo Cho, Dallas Regional Chamber President Jim Oberwetter, and Dallas Mayor Tom Leppert.

External links 
  Greater Dallas Korean American Chamber of Commerce

References 

 Williams, Shawn (2009-11-12).  "Mayor Tom Leppert to Visit South Korea and China with Trade Delegation". Dallas South News. Retrieved 2010-11-23.
  Business Success Stories Dallas Economic Development. Retrieved 2010-11-23.
 박지혜 (2010-08-13).  "달라스 경찰국, 한인들에게 감사". News Korea. Retrieved 2010-11-23.

Asian-American culture in the Dallas–Fort Worth metroplex
Dallas
Korean-American culture
Organizations based in Dallas
Koreatowns in the United States